Zaprešić is a town in Hrvatsko zagorje, Zagreb County in Croatia. It has a population of 19,644 inhabitants in the town proper, with 25,223 in the administrative area. The town's metropolitan area, which encompasses the seven neighbouring municipalities, has a population of 54,640. Zaprešić is the third-largest, and most densely populated town of the county. It is located northwest of the Croatian capital Zagreb, and near the Slovenian border. It is centered on plains north of the Sava River, and is bordered by Medvednica Mountain to the east, and the Marija Gorica Hills to the west.

The first human settlement in, and near Zaprešić dates from the Neolithic, and several Roman roads were constructed in the area. Vicinity to transport corridors is also reflected in the meaning of the name (za, 'near or behind', prešće 'crossing'). The first records of the settlement date from 1474. (although, some authors claim that the church of Saint Peter in Zaprešić could have been mentioned in a document supposedly written in 1334). In the late medieval and early modern times, the village history includes being a part of a feudal estate Susedgrad, as well of being a part of Brdovec parish.

During the 19th century the town was operating the first meat packaging plant in Croatia. However, it was not formally established as a town until 1995. The town is governed by a mayor, a town government of seven members (upper house), and a town council of twenty one (lower house). Zaprešić has its own fire department, but police coverage is provided by the City of Zagreb. Komunalno poduzeće Zaprešić manages all utilities except electricity. Tap water in Zaprešić is of high quality.

Due to its many rail, and road transport corridors, Zaprešić has been dubbed the "northwestern gate to Zagreb County". It lies directly next to the A2 highway connecting Zagreb to Central Europe. It also is adjacent to the main railway leading northwest out of Zagreb. Centered on the tertiary sector, the town's economy is booming due to a large population influx.

Zaprešić's educational facilities range from kindergartens to centers of higher education. The town is home to four elementary schools, one high school, and two universities. The Zaprešić metropolitan area contains six castles that together make up what is known as the "palace path." The town also has a museum and an art gallery. The most popular sport in the region is football, and the local team was NK Inter Zaprešić, that used to be a member of the First Football League of Croatia. Other sports are also present in Zaprešić, and the town is home to a golf resort.

History 
The first records of human inhabitants in area of what is today Zaprešić can be traced back to the Neolithic, which can be seen by stone axes found in nearby Brdovec, and axes from the Copper Age found in Marija Gorica. Halstatt culture traces were also uncovered in the area of Sveti Križ. The Romans left their imprints on nearby in the form of the Siscia–Neviodunum–Emona road, which followed Sava River on its left bank through area of what is today Zaprešić, passing near modern settlements.

After a lack of records from the first millennium, Zaprešić was mentioned in written sources in the late 11th century. In 1094, following the formation of the Zagreb Diocese, magnate called Aka, an advisor of the Hungarian-Croatian King Ladislav I, was granted land west and east of the Medvednica Mountain in order to protect the newly formed diocese.

Susedgrad-Stubica Seigniory 

In the 14th century, the area between rivers Krapina and Sutla (where today Zaprešić is located) was under control of ban of Slavonia. Multiple historical sources refer to this part of land as Zakrapina (probably due to it being behind Krapina river in relation to Susedgrad Castle). Zaprešić became part of the Susedgrad–Stubica Seigniory, centered around Susedgrad Castle westernmost banks of Medvednica. The seigniory was at a time a second-largest estate in the  Zagreb County. In 1334, the parish church of St. Peter was founded in Zaprešić, marking the first evidence of the modern settlement of Zaprešić. The settlement developed rapidly, which is attributed to its position on trade and transit routes.

During 15th and 16th centuries, refugees from Lika came to Zaprešić while fleeng the Croatian-Ottoman Wars. Some of these refugees were the so-called Brdovec Franciscans, for whom Lord Zylagy of Susedgrad built an abbey in Marija Gorica. The refugees brought along their Ikavian accent, which was preserved for a long time in some small Zaprešić communities, although the Zaprešić area has historically been Ekavian Kajkavian (yat being  or  rather than ). The area of Zaprešić and nearby vicinity in the 16th century was known for its vinyards and wine production. The area serfs from Zaprešić and nearby villages took part in famous Peasant revolt of 1573, led by Ambroz Gubec, with some of the serf leaders being from Zaprešić area. Ivan Kukuljević Sakcinski, for one thinks that Ambroz Gubec himself managed the estate of Jablanovec, part of modern Zaprešić. Another revolt leader was Ilija Gregorić, a resident of Marija Gorica. Another serf captain was Ivan Turković from Zaprešić.

Two years later, the large Susedgrad-Stubica Seigniory started to disintegrate into many small estates owned by members of lower nobility. Dozens of simple diocesan curia houses remained as a consequence of this.

Contemporary history 
In 1862, one of the first railway lines in Croatia: Zidani Most-Zagreb-Sisak - was constructed, and it passed through Zaprešić on its way to Zagreb.

In 1903, Zaprešić railway station was a hotspot of two anti-Hungarian riots caused by Khuen Hedervary's magyarization policy and breaking of Croatian-Hungarian Settlement of 1868 by installing Hungarian national symbols on railway objects across Croatia. These demonstrations were part of a wider national movement that swept the country at a time. In both occasions the demonstrations turned into a scuffle with local gendarmes which ended up with several peasants killed and dozens of locals arrested. Peasants that were killed or injured by the gendarmes are traditionally celebrated as a heroes and national martyrs. In their honour, two separate memorial boards were placed on the building of Zaprešić railway station in 1928. and 2003. After the First World War, the oldest meat industry in Croatia, the Industrija mesnih proizvoda, was founded.

Zaprešić was formally established for the first time in 1952, when the Municipality of Zaprešić was formed. The municipality operated as part of the Zagreb kotar and later City of Zagreb. The Town of Zaprešić (Grad Zaprešić) was incorporated on 30 November 1995. On that day, parts of the surrounding municipalities of Pušća, and Hruševec Kupljenski (which was disbanded, leaving only a namesake settlement) and the City of Zagreb were incorporated into a new Town of Zaprešić. The settlement of Merenje came under the jurisdiction of Zaprešić on 17 January 1997.

Geography 

Zaprešić is a part of the metropolitan area of Croatia's capital and largest city, Zagreb. The small Lužnica River marks the western border of Zaprešić. The Zaprešić metropolitan area consists of Zaprešić and seven surrounding municipalities: Bistra, Brdovec, Dubravica, Jakovlje, Luka, Marija Gorica, and Pušća. It is located in the northwestern part of Zagreb County, bordered on the south by the Sava River, on the east by Zagreb and the Medvednica Mountain, and on the west by the Sutla River and the Slovenian border. According to the official website, three distinct geographic areas make up the Zaprešić area: the western part of the Medvednica Mountain, the Marija Gorica Hills and the plains that lie between. The western part of the Medvednica Mountain is fairly lightly inhabited, with no settlements except at the base of the mountain. These include the Bistra municipality and the Zaprešić settlement of Jablanovec. The Marija Gorica Hills are located mainly in the Marija Gorica municipality between the rivers of Krapina, and Sutla. The third area, the plains, is the area where the Zaprešić itself is located. Zaprešić has a lake, Lake Zajarki, situated between the town and the Sava River in the south. It is colloquially known as Bager (Croatian word for excavator). The lake is currently still used as a gravel pit, although it is a known destination for Zaprešić swimmers and beach goers, as well as local people and foreign tourists who do recreational fishing. Fishing activities on lake Zajarki are regulated by Šrd Šaran, Zaprešić. In 2017. the picnic zone was built on eastern side of a big lake which includes barbecue houses and beach volleyball, handball and football fields.

Demographics 
According to the 2011 census, the town of Zaprešić has 25,223 inhabitants, 19,644 of whom live in the settlement of Zaprešić.
This makes the urban area of Zaprešić, at 1,036 inhabitants per square kilometer (2,683 per square mile), the most densely populated in the whole of Zagreb County.
The metropolitan area of Zaprešić had 54,640 inhabitants in 2011, an increase from 51,040 inhabitants in 2001.
About 96% of inhabitants are Croats and 98.3% speak Croatian as their mother tongue. The sex ratio is 90.63 men to 100 women, and the median age is 39.9 years, which makes Zaprešić one of the younger towns in Zagreb County.

The town is administratively divided into nine settlements, the largest of which is Zaprešić, covering a third of the town's area.

Austro-Hungarian 1910 census
According to the 1910 census in Croatia, town of Zaprešić had 5,058 inhabitants, which were linguistically and religiously declared to be:

Economy 

Due to its accessible location with favorable conditions for expansion, and a very high net migration, and population growth rates (estimated to be 29 persons per 1,000 per year), Zaprešić is expecting an economic boom. Despite the ongoing financial crisis that hit many cities in Croatia, including the capital, the town operates without loans and expects a yearly budget increase in the range of 20 to 30 percent. The tertiary sector is dominant with mainly retailing, and hospitality, and a smaller presence of tourism, as well as souvenir manufacturing and financial services. The secondary sector is also present with ceramic industry (Inker - as of 2006 part of Roca), metalworking (Karbon Nova, Lanac, and Unija metali) and chemical industry (Messer Croatia plin, Montkemija). The primary sector mainly consists of agriculture, and is expected to continue shrinking. The future of Zaprešić's economy is seen in the development of small, and mid-sized businesses, tourism, and food-related industries. The town's income tax rate is 12 percent. The town's budget in 2008 amounted to HRK 198 million.

The West Gate Shopping Center is a shopping mall planned to create a major job demand in the Zaprešić region. Located next to the Krapina River and A2 motorway, the center serves 2.3 million residents in the Zagreb region. Construction started in late 2007. It was opened in October 2009.

Culture and media 

Zaprešić's cultural heritage includes a series of six historic castles and palaces known as "the palace path": Lužnica mansion, Januševac palace, Laduč mansion, Oršić family mansion, Jakovlje palace, and Novi Dvori. Of these, Oršić and Januševec are in the zeroth category of cultural heritage preservation of UNESCO, Lužnica is in the first category of the Croatian Ministry of Culture, and Laduč and Novi Dvori are in the second category of the Ministry of Culture. Jakovlje palace is not involved in any cultural preservation program. Novi Dvori (also known as Novi Dvori Jelačićevi – New Jelačić Palace) is known for being the residence of Josip Jelačić, one of the most famous Croatian bans. However, before that it was inhabited by five families (the last one being Erdödy) after its construction in 1611 as a simple two-story house. It remains a well-preserved example of a manorial estate. The palace was left to the state in 1934 by Josip Jelačić's nephew and nieces.

The town is home to the Museum of Matija Skurjeni (opened in 1984), a gallery of works by the renowned painter. It is located in the former granary of Novi Dvori. The art gallery Razvid, that opened in 1991, has held exhibitions of works by many important Croatian artists, such as Franjo Ferenčak, Ivan Lovrenčić, Drago Grgas, Davor Vuković (a native of Zaprešić) and Krešimir Trumbetaš.
The Zaprešić main library, "Ante Kovačić", is a part of the association of Zagreb City Libraries (KGZ), and has 5,541 members with access to 78,385 books. Albin Bonzelli, an employee of Baron Levin Rauch, founded the first library in 
Zaprešić area in 1921 in Brdovec. A more recent library was founded in 1958, and moved to its present location in 1986.

Zaprešić contains the ornithological reserve Zaprešić-Sava, which is located south of the town, at Lake Zajarki. The reserve is covered mainly with woods and thick low vegetation, and criss-crossed by fluvial marshes. Zaprešić operates a hunting office, which is made of eight clubs: Zaprešić, Kuna, Vidra, Fazan, Srnjak, Šljuka (offices in Luka, and Bistra) and Vepar. A radio station operates in Zaprešić: Radio Zaprešić (also known as Round Wave Station Zaprešić). The station broadcasts an FM signal at 96.0 and 99.5 MHz, 24 hours each weekday. It was founded on 15 January 1987. In September 2015., radio station changed its name to "Z fm". The local monthly newspaper Prigorski Kaj has its seat in the nearby settlement of Šenkovec in the Brdovec municipality. In 2009. Television Zaprešić (Croatian: Televizija Zaprešić) started operating as a local cable television channel. In April 2015., Television Zaprešić was granted concession for terrestrial broadcasting and changed its name to Televizija Zapad (English: Television West). The television is dedicated to cover the topics of local importance.

Sports and recreation 

Organized sports in Zaprešić started in 1926, with the first football match between unregistered teams from Zaprešić and Savski Marof. The football club NK Sava (now called NK Inter Zaprešić) was soon formed in 1929. There are 20 sport clubs and associations in Zaprešić, and the most popular ones are association football, basketball, handball, bowling, tennis, table tennis, chess, cycling, taekwondo, and bocce. Zaprešić is the home to several influential sports clubs, such as NK Inter Zaprešić (football), KK Fortuna Zaprešić (basketball), RK Zaprešić (handball), KK Zaprešić (bowling) and others. NK Inter Zaprešić currently plays in the top tier Hrvatski Telekom Prva Liga. It is currently the best-placed football club in the county. Most of the sports clubs in Zaprešić are members of the Town of Zaprešić Sports Society. The main sports venue is the ŠRC Zaprešić (Sports and Recreation Center Zaprešić), which encompasses a football stadium and a gym. There are other sports courts in Hruševec Kupljenski, Ivanec, Jablanovec, Kupljenovo, and Pojatno. NK Inter Zaprešić's home stadium is ŠRC Zaprešić, located in the northwest part of the town and handling up to 5,528 visitors.

The  golf resort "Novi dvori" was opened on 16 October 2004, with Prime Minister Ivo Sanader being the first to tee off. However, only a few parts are in use, with a 27-hole course currently under construction. Nine of these holes will be reserved for practice and eighteen for tournament play. The center operates a driving range with two practice courses of different sizes, and an area to practice putting green play. One practice course is sheltered from weather conditions and the whole golf course has night lighting. In terms of normal play, three par 3 holes are currently operational and friendly par 9 tournaments are often held at the course. The course also has other amenities, such as a restaurant and the proximity to the Novi Dvori palace. When the construction ends, the golfers will have access to a conference room, a business center, a fitness club, a sauna, and a massage parlor.

Government 

Despite the settlement of Zaprešić's long history, only with the founding of the Town of Zaprešić on 30 November 1995 did it have its own elected representatives. The towns administration includes two tiers of power: a mayor and a town council. The town council is elected each four years.  The mayor has executive power. He is elected directly by the voters. Current Mayor is Željko Turk (Croatian Democratic Union—HDZ, elected in 2006, re-elected 2009, 2013 and 2017), whose deputy's are Damir Benčević and Alan Labus. Zaprešić is part of the 1st Croatian electoral district, which consists of western Zagreb, and the Zaprešić metropolitan area.

The town council has the legislative power over the town. It represents the residents of Zaprešić and manages the town's budget, and it is composed of twenty one members with one presiding and two vice-presiding members.

Education 

The Town of Zaprešić provides education ranging from pre-school to higher education. These include four registered kindergartens (stationed on seven locations), four elementary schools, one high school, and one college. Elementary schools located in Zaprešić include Antun Augustinčić, Ljudevit Gaj, and Kupljenovo elementary schools, and a branch of the Bistra elementary school from the Bistra municipality. The Ban Josip Jelačić High School is located on the Franjo Tuđman Square in the northwestern part of the town. Zaprešić has a University of Applied Sciences which offers courses in business and management, named after the Croatian historian and theologian Baltazar Adam Krčelić, and located in the town center on Novak Street. The open university in Zaprešić offers various courses in languages, computer science, and musical instruments, as well as vocational training.

Infrastructure 
Zaprešić is covered mostly by the postal code "10290 Zaprešić", and Croatian Mail operates four post offices in the town: in Ivanec Bistranski, Lužnica, Šibice and Zaprešić. The town proper overlaps with the areas of postal codes "10294 Donja Pušća" (Pojatno), "10295 Kupljenovo" (Hruševec Kupljenski, Kupljenovo, Merenje) and "10298 Donja Bistra" (Jablanovec). Zaprešić has its own police station, PP Zaprešić, a Zagreb County branch of the City of Zagreb Police Department responsible for all of the Zaprešić metropolitan area. Fire coverage is provided by the Town of Zaprešić Fire Department, which also serves the complete seven-municipality metropolitan area. There are six volunteer fire brigades in Zaprešić proper, all members of the Zaprešić Firefighting Community. Zaprešić also has a municipal court.

All utilities except electricity are managed by Komunalno poduzeće Zaprešić. Zaprešić's electricity is, as in the rest of Croatia, provided by Hrvatska elektroprivreda, and distributed by Elektra Zagreb, a company managing access to electricity in Zagreb, and Zagreb County. Zaprešić receives tap water from underground water reserves through a water pump in the settlement of Šibice. The water from the water pump is of drinking quality. However, local factories Pliva, and Kvasac produce waste water, which is released into the Sava River through the Harmica-Pliva-Zaprešić water treatment plant. Before the construction of the treatment plant, the polluted water was piped into the Gorjak Creek, endangering the tap water quality. Possible consequences of releasing waste water into the Sava will be dealt with by the construction of the Zajarki water purification system for screening the used water. The ecological problem is multiplied by the fact that the utility company received only 400 requests to clean septic tanks in 2007, although most households in the relatively rural surroundings of Zaprešić use septic systems. There are plans of constructing four hydroelectric power plants around Zagreb with one being in Zaprešić (HE Zaprešić, also known as HE Podsused) as a part of a system of exploiting natural resources of the Sava River.

Public safety 
There are two firefighting units active in Zaprešić proper: 

 Zaprešić Fire Department  (Javna vatrogasna postrojba grada Zaprešića) - professional firefighting unit, active under this name since January 2000.
 Zaprešić Volunteer Fire Department (Dobrovoljno vatrogasno društvo Zaprešić) - volunteer firefighting unit, founded in February 1901. One of the oldest of its kind in Croatia.

Transport 

The town is a major transport hub for the area of Zagreb County and Zagreb itself. It is thus known as the "northwestern gate to Zagreb County." The Zagreb bypass, and the tolled A2 highway (Zagreb–Macelj, toward Austria; part of European Route E59, and pan-European corridor Xa) pass through the eastern part of Zaprešić, providing Zaprešić with highway access at a cloverleaf interchange. The D225 state road is a major arterial road in Zaprešić. It forms the Pavao Lončar and Marshal Tito Streets, leading west towards Brdovec, Marija Gorica and Slovenia, and east towards western Zagreb, Jablanovec, and Stubica. According to the current urban plan, the traffic on the D225 will be re-routed through two bypasses along the northern and western railway lines to clear the center of Zaprešić of 25,000 daily commuters driving on a two-lane road.

Mass transit provides intra-city and inter-city connections in form of bus and rail. Zaprešić is a major railway intersection, with railways leading west to Slovenia (Corridor X), north to Zabok, and Kumrovec (Corridor Xa) and east to the main regional railway hub Zagreb. Croatian Railways services the Zaprešić train station with major interstate trains going to the west, but also with the suburban line Savski Marof–Zagreb Main Station–Dugo Selo. The town is serviced by two bus companies: the regional Zagrebački električni tramvaj (ZET) and local Meštrović prijevoz. ZET operates line 172 to Zaprešić, which starts at the Črnomerec bus terminal in Zagreb and runs every 8 to 15 minutes during day, and at irregular intervals during the night. Lines 176 and 177 run to the Zaprešić suburban municipality of Bistra. Meštrović prijevoz, the main intra-city bus company of Zaprešić, operates bus lines connecting Zaprešić and all municipalities in its metropolitan area.

Zaprešić lies along the left bank of the Sava River, but it does not have any bridges that would connect the town to Samobor, on the other bank, as the nearest bridge is the Podsused bridge, located in the Podsused – Vrapče district of Zagreb. However, two ferries connect Zaprešić with the roads in Medsave and Samoborski Otok, small villages near Samobor. The widest river in the area, the Sava River, used to be navigable up to Krško, Slovenia in Roman times. However, it is, navigable only up to Rugvica, leaving Zaprešić with no more possibility of river transport. The town does not have a port on any of its rivers.

To establish better transport capabilities, and create a solid ground for the emerging air sports that are already available in the town (e.g. hang gliding or paragliding), an airport is planned northeast of the town, between the Krapina River and the railroad. The land at this location is unused, uninhabited, and administratively selected for sports and recreation. The arrangement of the runways, taxiways, air traffic control building, hangar, and other necessary buildings have already been determined. The airport is intended to serve primarily as a sports airport, for teaching flying, and for charter flights.  the date when the construction starts had not yet been announced.

Notable inhabitants 

A known historical resident of Zaprešić was Count Josip Jelačić of Bužim (1801–59), the Ban of Croatia from 1848 until his death. Although born in Novi Sad, Serbia (then Habsburg Monarchy), he received an estate in Zaprešić together with his title. He is responsible for abolishing serfdom in Croatia in 1848, but also for an infamous suppression of Croatian intelligentsia, and the Illyrian movement during his reign under the orders of Baron Alexander von Bach, and Emperor Franz Joseph I. A statue of Jelačić riding a horse was constructed by Anton Dominik Fernkorn, and placed on the Zagreb's central square, Ban Jelačić Square. The statue has been repeatedly removed, and reinstated during changes in political power and orientation in Croatia, from monarchist, through ultra-nationalist, and communist, up to democratic. After the Croatian declaration of independence, marking the start of the democratic era, the statue was returned to the square, and Zaprešić credits Jelačić with a major arterial road named in his honor.

Baltazar Adam Krčelić (1715–78), a historian, theologian, legal expert, and a canon in Zagreb, lived in what became the Zaprešić metropolitan area. Actually born in Šenkovec, Brdovec, he was rector of the Collegium Croaticum Viennense in Vienna. He wrote 757 books in Latin, and the Kajkavian dialect of Croatian.

The Illyrian movement of Slavic independence in Croatia can also be traced to Zaprešić through two of its citizens: Ivan Perkovac (1826–71), publicist from Harmica, Brdovec, editor of Vijenac and Pozor, secretary of Matica hrvatska, and a member of Sabor, the Croatian parliament; and Pavao Štoos (1806–62), a poet, a priest, and an important member of the Illyrian movement from Dubravica. Ante Kovačić (1854–89) from Marija Gorica lived in the aftermath of the Illyrian movement, but nevertheless became a fruitful writer. His most important work is U registraturi, a novel following the life of Ivica Kičmanović, a peasant who is raised in a village and goes to live in a large city.

Zaprešić's recent history includes several known Croatian public figures, such as Matija Skurjeni (1898–1990), a Croatian naïve painter who lived in Zaprešić from 1953 until his death. He was a co-founder of the Croatian Society of Naïve Painters. An art gallery with his works was opened in Zaprešić in 1987. This art gallery changed to a museum in 2000. Other well-known inhabitants include Davor Gobac (b. 1964), the frontman of Psihomodo Pop. Although he was born in Karlovac, he is a resident of Zaprešić; Davor Vuković (b. 1951), a painter and poet from Herceg Novi, residing in Zaprešić; and Mira Vlahović, an opera singer. Vlahović sang at the Croatian National Theater. The music scene in Zaprešić includes Connect, a hip hop band formed in Zaprešić. Connect is the creator of the Croatian football hip hop hymn "Samo je jedno". Croatian politician and current Croatian Minister of Interior, Davor Božinović, also resides in Zaprešić.

Notes

References

External links 

 Zaprešić official website 
 Zaprešić on the Zagreb County Tourist Board
 Map of Zaprešić

 
Cities and towns in Croatia
Populated places in Zagreb County
Populated places established in the 1330s
1330s establishments in Europe